Geliebte weiße Maus  (Beloved White Mouse) is a 1964 East German musical film. Produced by Eric Kuhne, the film had music by Conny Odd with cinematography by Gunter Haubold. Fritz Bachmann (Rolf Herricht) is the Weiss Maus (White Mouse), a term for the traffic policemen in East Germany because of their white uniform and cap, who gets involved with a girl, Helene Brauer (Karin Schroder), on a red scooter who drives his route every day for work.

Plot 
In the film, Rolf Herricht portrays the traffic policeman Fritz Bachmann in Dresden. Every morning he meets the pretty Helene, who drives across his intersection on her scooter. He doesn't dare speak to her. Finally, she takes the initiative and fakes a small accident in order to start a conversation with him. She is then invited to his traffic training course. Ultimately, both find their way to the registry office together. Conny Odd's setting of the material as a carom was one of the most successful musicals of the GDR's Heiteren Musiktheater. (First performance: September 11, 1969, Theater Gera).

Cast

References

External links
 

1964 films
1964 musical films
German musical films
East German films
1960s German-language films
Films directed by Gottfried Kolditz
1960s German films